Trabzonspor Basketbol Kulübü, also known as Trabzonspor Basket or Trabzonspor, was a professional basketball club based in the city of Trabzon, Turkey. It was a department of the multi-sport club of Trabzonspor. Trabzonspor played seven seasons in the Basketbol Süper Ligi, the highest tier in Turkey. The club withdrew in 2018 due to financial problems.

Their home arena was the Hayri Gür Arena, which has a capacity of 7,500 seats, and was opened in 2011.

History
Trabzonspor's football club was founded in 1967, and it opened its basketball section in 2008. After Alpella's relegation in the 2007–08 season, Trabzonspor's board purchased all of the rights related to the team from the Ülker Group, and took their place in the Turkish Second Division for the 2008–09 season.

Trabzonspor promoted to the top-tier TBL (now called BSL), after they won the championship of the Turkish Division in the 2009–10 season.

In the 2014–15 season, Trabzonspor made its European debut in the EuroChallenge. The club managed to reach the Final Four which was played in its home arena Hayri Gür Arena. In the semi-final, Trabzonspor beat Romanian side Energia by a wide margin, 63–83. In the final, the team narrowly lost to JSF Nanterre from France with a score of 63–64. Nanterre scored a buzzer-beater which costed Trabzon its first European title.

In 2015, Trabzonspor played in the EuroCup Basketball competition, Europe's second tier. Here, it was eliminated in the Round of 32.

On 2 October 2018, Trabzonspor announced its withdrawal from the BSL due to financial problems. Eventually, the club ceased its basketball activities.

Sponsporship names
 Trabzonspor : 2008–2010
 Medical Park Trabzonspor : 2010–2011
 Trabzonspor : 2011–2013
 Trabzonspor Medical Park : 2013–2017
 Trabzonspor : 2017–2018

Achievements
Turkish Basketball League
Fourth: (1) 2015
Turkish Second League 
Winners (2): 2010, 2013
EuroChallenge
Runners-up: (1) 2015

Season by season

Notable players

  
 Birkan Batuk
 Kerem Özkan
 Polat Kaya
 Kaya Peker
 Tutku Açık
 Can Maxim Mutaf
 Nusret Yıldırım
 Berkay Candan
 Sertaç Şanlı
 Can Korkmaz
 Can Altıntığ
 Alper Saruhan
 Erolcan Çinko
 Deniz Kılıçlı
 Aleksandar Rašić
- Igor Milošević
 Jurica Žuža
 Kirk Penney
 Andrija Stipanović
 Novica Veličković
 Kaloyan Ivanov
 Damian Kulig
- Michael Wright
- Derrick Obasohan
 Mike Scott
 Harold Jamison
 Elton Brown
 Jonathan Gibson
 Russell Robinson
 Marc Salyers
 Kevinn Pinkney
 Khalid El-Amin
 Jack Cooley
- Paul Stoll
 Jerome Randle
- Gani Lawal
 Dee Bost
 Sean Marshall
 Tarence Kinsey
 Darius Johnson-Odom
 Derwin Kitchen
 J.P. Prince
 Julian Wright
 Jorge Gutierrez
 Dwight Hardy
 Šarūnas Vasiliauskas

Head coaches
  
 Alaeddin Yakan (2008–09, 2009–10, 2010–11)
 Dragan Sakota (2010–11)
 Tolga Öngören (2011–12)
 Halil Üner (2011–12, 2012–13)
 Hasan Özmeriç (2012–13, 2013–14)
 Hakan Demir (2013–14, 2014–15)
 Nenad Markovic (2014–15, 2015–16)
 Ahmet Kandemir (2015–16)
 Sergey Bazarevich (2016–17)
 Zare Markovski (2017–18)

See also
 Trabzonspor

References

External links
Official Site
Team Profile at Eurobasket
ULEB Eurocup
FIBA Eurochallenge
TBLstat.net Profile
BSL.org.tr

Trabzonspor
Sport in Trabzon
Basketball teams established in 2008
Basketball teams disestablished in 2019
2008 establishments in Turkey
Basketball